The Coulee Region Chill was a Tier III junior ice hockey team that played at the Green Island Ice Arena in La Crosse, Wisconsin. The team played in the North American 3 Hockey League. The franchise was previously known as the Flint Jr. Generals based in Flint, Michigan, and the La Crosse Freeze. Due to the loss of the Chill's home arena, the team ceased operations and the franchise was sold to the Oklahoma City Jr. Blazers organization in 2020.

History

Flint Junior Generals
In 1998, Gale and Kelly Cronk, a father and son, purchased the team placing it in the Flint area. The team played at the Iceland Arena in Clayton Township.

Despite on-ice success and their age, the Jr. Generals attendance dwindled, causing long-time owners Kelly and Gale Cronk to pursue selling the team. In 2013, the Cronks declined to sell to a buyer in Fort Wayne, Indiana, as they wanted the team to stay in Michigan and handed over operations to Fairland Management, managing company of the Michigan Warriors and Perani Arena. That season, the Generals were the NA3HL playoffs runner-up and won the East Division. With no Michigan-based interest, the Cronks sold the franchise to the owners of the Coulee Region Chill of the North American Hockey League.

La Crosse Freeze/Coulee Region Chill
With the league's approval of the sale to Michelle Bryant on May 6, 2014, the Flint Junior Generals became the La Crosse Freeze and relocated to the Green Island Ice Arena in La Crosse, Wisconsin. In 2018, Bryant sold her Tier II North American Hockey League team, the Coulee Region Chill and it was relocated to become the Chippewa Steel. Bryant then renamed the Freeze to the Coulee Region Chill. In early April 2020, Bryant announced the team would not play during the 2020–21 season due to the city's decision to no longer operate Green Island Ice Arena.

On May 19, 2020, the NA3HL announced the purchase and relocation of the Chill to become the Oklahoma City Jr. Blazers.

Season records

References

External links
 La Crosse Freeze Official website

Amateur ice hockey teams in Wisconsin
Sports in La Crosse, Wisconsin
2014 establishments in Wisconsin
Ice hockey clubs established in 2014
Ice hockey clubs disestablished in 2020
Defunct ice hockey teams in the United States